The 13th Army Band is a United States National Guard military band stationed in Miramar, Florida. The unit is a part of the Florida National Guard, headquartered at St. Augustine. According to retired Adjutant General, Major General Michael A. Calhoun, the band is the "best kept secret in the National Guard. The band is under the direction of CW3 Stephen K. Rivero and performs at musical support for military functions, civic events and air shows.

Lineage & Honors
Organized and Federally recognized 25 February 1930 in the Florida National Guard as the Band Section, headquarters Battery, 265th Coast Artillery at Miami
Reorganized and redesignated 1 March 1940 as the Band, 265th Coast Artillery
Inducted into Federal service 6 January 1941 at Miami
Reorganized and redesignated 18 May 1944 as the 96th Army Ground Forces Band
Inactivated 23 October 1945 at Fort Leonard Wood, Missouri
Redesignated 5 July 1946 as the 51st Infantry Division Band
Reorganized and Federally recognized 15 April 1947 at Miami 
Location changed 15 April 1959 to North Miami
Reorganized and redesignated 15 February 1963 as the 13th Army Band and relieved from assignment to the 51st Infantry Division
Location changed 2006 to Pembroke Pines
Location changed 2015 to Ft Lauderdale
Location changed 2017 to Miramar

Commanders

Notable members
WO Caesar LaMonaca

Historical Narrative

The 13th Army Band has a lineage dating back to 1930, when it was organized as the band section of the 265th Air Defense Artillery Regiment in Miami, which was the 265th Coast Artillery at the time. The 265th Air Defense Artillery Regiment Band supported harbor security operations in Ft. Crockett, Texas and Ft. Greely, Alaska through World War II.
In 1944, it was re-designated as the 96th Army Ground Forces Band, which served until its deactivation in 1945.

In 1946, the band was re-designated as the 51st Infantry Division Band. The 51st Infantry Division was composed of National Guardsmen from South Carolina and Florida and the band usually performed Annual Training with the infantry at bases such as Ft. Polk and Ft. McClellan.

In 1947 the band was activated for flood relief in Ft. Lauderdale and for the opening of Everglades National Park.

In 1952, the band earned the Eisenhower Trophy for being, "the most outstanding company sized unit in the Florida National Guard."

In 1957, the band moved to the North Miami Armory.

From 17–26 March 1960, the band was activated for flood relief in the Tampa area.

In 1963 the band was reorganized and re-designated as the 13th Army Band of the Florida National Guard. With the entire state of Florida as its Area of Operations, the band took missions from the Goodwill Ball in downtown Miami in 1970, to gubernatorial inaugurations every four years in Tallahassee, and everything in between. The band has performed in hundreds of civic parades, military pass and reviews, and became a staple at the annual OCS graduations at Camp Blanding and the National Guard Association Conferences, held around the state.

In 1973, the band enlisted one of the first females into the Florida National Guard, Susan Seaman. Previously, women were only allowed in the Guard as Army nurses.

In 1975 and 1976, the band had a variety of high-profile performances in celebration of the National Bicentennial, the US' 200th birthday.
In the early 1980s, elements of the band were mobilized for civil missions during the McDuffie riots and the Mariel boatlift.
In 1985, Voice of America requested the band play a series of concerts at a relay station in Costa Rica. The band performed in neighboring Panama as well as Costa Rica. Later that year the band was invited to perform for the 10th anniversary ceremony of NGPEC in Arkansas.
In 1987, the 13th Army Band was awarded the Army National Guard Superior Unit Award. The following year the band was invited to Washington DC to perform for the Association of the United States Army.

In 1990, the band traveled to the Dominican Republic and to Morocco on cultural exchange assignments. In Santo Domingo, the band was mobbed wherever they went and they were treated as stars after performing on a local television variety show. The Moroccan visit was to support State Department employees and to perform patriotic 4 July receptions at American embassies in Rabat and Casablanca.

In 1992, South Florida was devastated by Hurricane Andrew. The band was immediately activated to organize relief supply distribution to affected civilians. As soon as enough troops were in place to continue that mission, the band began to perform for thousands of Floridians who were homeless or had no power.

Throughout the 1990s and continuing today, the band has supported requests from SOUTHCOM as well as other military branches including the Coast Guard. The 13th is one of a very few National Guard units authorized to wear the Coast Guard Meritorious Team Commendation ribbon.

In the early 2000s, bandsmen volunteered for border patrol operations and counter-drug assignments among other operations during the Global War on Terrorism. The 13th Army Band was awarded the Adjutant General's Trophy in 2004, for superior performance as a unit.

The band was crucial in the dedication of the World War II memorial in Tallahassee in 2005. Bandsmen, and particularly buglers, have worked constantly at cemeteries throughout Florida as part of the Military Funeral Honors teams. They give the last solemn farewell to fallen veterans.

Throughout 2005, Florida was hit with a rash of hurricanes. The 13th Army Band was partially activated for Hurricane Frances and fully activated for Hurricane Wilma.

During Hurricane Wilma recovery efforts, the band offloaded over 180 tractor-trailers full of relief supplies. A band detachment worked in the Florida Keys distributing over 10,000 meals and countless pounds of ice and water.

In 2007, 13th Army Band personnel performed in the Super Bowl XLI pre-game show, before a live audience of over 74,000 and a television audience of over 93 million people.

The band earned an Army Superior Unit Award for support of the 2008 Presidential Inauguration. Later the same year, a group of bandsmen traveled to St. Kitts to participate in a state partnership training exchange and to perform at several celebratory events.

In 2009, several members of the band volunteered for deployment in support of Operation Iraqi Freedom.

In 2011 and 2012, band Subject Matter Expert Teams deployed to Guyana in South America, to assist in developing relations between the Guyana Defence Forces Military Band and the Florida National Guard and to help foster goodwill with the Guyanese citizens. In two engagements the band supported State Department personnel stationed in Guyana with patriotic concerts and performed multiple community outreach missions which brought numerous accolades to the group.

The 13th Army Band performed a cultural exchange aboard a Chilean Navy training ship, Esmeralda docked at the Port of Miami in 2016. Later that year, Chief Stephen K Rivero was invited to support the Tumon Music Festival during a visit to Guam.

In 2017, the unit was activated in response to Hurricane Irma, where they assisted in emergency operations throughout Florida.

Unit members have supported DSCA operations in support of Hurricane Michael and Hurricane Dorian and have performed at the Miami Marathon in 2019 and 2020.

In 2020 the unit was asked to volunteer for Coronavirus disease 2019 response and activated most of its members.  They helped set up the Hard Rock Stadium testing center in the first few days of Florida's military response to the crisis.

The 13th Army Band is so well regarded that the 13th Army Band Commander has have been tasked by the National Guard Bureau to perform evaluation and assistance visits to almost every state on the east coast of the U.S. 13th Army Band Commander, CW3 Stephen K. Rivero is one of only six officers sitting on the Army Bands Advisory Council, which assists in planning the future of National Guard bands.

Decorations

OTHER DECORATIONS

 Eisenhower Trophy - 1952
 Governor's Trophy - 1961
 Pershing Trophy - 1961,1962

Ensembles
The nature of military operations in general and the requirements of modern military musicians specifically require the band to be able to play simultaneous engagements. Currently the band fields several ensembles which can operate at multiple sites independently:
 Concert Band
 Big Band
 Latin Band
 Brass Ensemble
 Woodwind Ensemble

See also 
 United States military bands
 Florida National Guard

Notes

External links
 13th Army Band on DVIDS
 13th AB Army Bands Online site
 13th Army Band videos
  Memorial Healthcare System hosts 'Salute to Military' meeting
 Defence Force, Florida National Guard bands play in Independence Parade
 National Guard supports gubernatorial transition

013
Wind bands
Musical groups established in 1930
Ceremonial units of the United States military